Valge is an Estonian surname meaning "white". As of 1 January 2021, 292 men and 315 women in Estonia have the surname Valge. Valge is ranked as the 154th most common surname for men in Estonia, and 159th for women. The surname Valge is the most common in Võru County, where 13.58 per 10,000 inhabitants of the county bear the surname.

Notable people bearing the Valge surname include:

Allan Valge (1979–2015), mountaineer
Anne Valge (1954–2013), actress
Jaak Valge (born 1955), historian and politician
Jüri Valge (born 1948), linguist
Robert Valge (born 1997), basketball player
Riivo Valge (born 1975), military colonel
Voldemar Valge (1909–2002), singer

References

Estonian-language surnames